Joseph Francis Wall  (July 24, 1873 –  July 17, 1936) was a  Major League Baseball player.

Career
Wall served as a catcher in 15 games for the New York Giants and Brooklyn Superbas during the 1901 and 1902 seasons.

External links

1873 births
1936 deaths
Major League Baseball catchers
Brooklyn Superbas players
New York Giants (NL) players
Sportspeople from Brooklyn
Baseball players from New York City
Minor league baseball managers
Brockton Shoemakers players
Norwich Witches players
Springfield Ponies players
Springfield Maroons players
Columbus Senators players
Toledo Swamp Angels players
Denver Grizzlies (baseball) players
Milwaukee Creams players
Troy Trojans (minor league) players
Rochester Bronchos players
Lowell Tigers players
Taunton Tigers players
Muscatine Wallopers players
New York Knickerbockers (1912) players
Nashville Vols players
Burials at Green-Wood Cemetery